Valiyavilapuram is a suburb in the Perumkadavila Block Panchayat, Aryancode panchayat of Thiruvananthapuram District in Kerala South India. This place is around 1 km from Ottasekharamangalam, around 9 km from Vellarada, around 8 km from Kattakada and around 15 km from Neyyattinkara.

Valiyavilapuram is the place where the Thudali-Vellarada road meets the Ottasekharamangalam-Vellarada road. Shri C K Hareendran of CPI(M) is the sitting MLA of this place.[1]

References

Villages in Thiruvananthapuram district